Twenty-Five Twenty-One is a 2022 South Korean television series directed by Jung Ji-hyun and starring Kim Tae-ri, Nam Joo-hyuk, Bona, Choi Hyun-wook and Lee Joo-myung. The series depicts the romantic lives of five characters spanning from the year of 1998 to 2021. It premiered on tvN on February 12, 2022, and aired every Saturday and Sunday at 21:10 (KST) for 16 episodes. It is available for streaming on Netflix.

The series was a commercial hit and became one of the highest-rated dramas in Korean cable television history.

Plot
In 1998, Na Hee-do (Kim Tae-ri) is a member of the school fencing team at Seonjung Girls' High School, but due to the IMF crisis, the team is disbanded. To continue pursuing her passion, she transfers to Taeyang High School and later manages to become a member of the National Fencing Team. Baek Yi-jin’s (Nam Joo-hyuk) family goes from "riches to rags" and is separated due to the financial crisis. He is forced to take up several part-time jobs and later becomes a sports reporter.

In present day, Kim Min-chae (Choi Myung-bin), Na Hee-do's daughter, quits ballet and "runs away" to her grandma's house. During her stay, she comes across her mother's diary, through which the story is then told.

Cast and characters

Main
 Kim Tae-ri as Na Hee-do (나희도)
 Kim So-hyun as adult Na Hee-do
 Ok Ye-rin as young Na Hee-do
A fencing prodigy, who has yet to reach her fullest potential. She idolizes Ko Yu-rim and transfers to her high school specifically to train with her.
 Nam Joo-hyuk as Baek Yi-jin (백이진)
A hardworking young man whose chaebol family went bankrupt during the IMF crisis. As such, he moves out on his own in an attempt to rebuild his life despite debt collectors knocking on his door all the time.
 Bona as Ko Yu-rim/Julia Ko (고유림)
 Kyung Da-eun as young Ko Yu-rim
A high-school fencing gold medalist whom Hee-do idolizes, and her greatest rival.
 Choi Hyun-wook as Moon Ji-woong (문지웅)
Na Hee-do's classmate and the most popular boy in school.
 Lee Joo-myung as Ji Seung-wan (지승완)
The class president and Moon Ji-woong's childhood friend. She has an anonymous radio talk show in which she raises awareness on the problems of the youth while also giving guidance to fellow students.

Supporting

People around Na Hee-do
 Seo Jae-hee as Shin Jae-kyung (신재경)
Na Hee-do's mother, and the main anchor of the UBS Nine O'Clock News.
Baek Seok-gwang as Na Seong-jin (나성진)
Na Hee-do's father. Primarily appearing in flashbacks, he is shown to be the key player in Na Hee-do's interest in fencing.
 Choi Myung-bin as Kim Min-chae (김민채)
 Lee So-yeon as young Kim Min-chae  
Na Hee-do's daughter. She is a ballet dancer who quit and ran away to her grandmother's home, later finding her mother's diary which chronicles her teenage years. The identity of her father is left unknown throughout the show.

People around Baek Yi-jin
 Park Yoon-hee as Baek Seong-hak (백성학)
Baek Yi-jin's father, who is in debt due to the IMF crisis. 
Kim Young-sun as Baek Yi-jin's mother 
 Park Jun-pyo as Baek Yi-jin's maternal uncle
He is the one who accepted Yi-jin's family when they had no place to go after bankruptcy.
 Kim Nam-i as Baek Yi-jin's paternal aunt
 Choi Min-young as Baek Yi-hyun (백이현)
 Kang Hoon as adult Baek Yi-hyun 
Baek Yi-jin's younger brother.

Family of the other main characters
 So Hee-jung as Ji Seung-wan's mother
She is also Baek Yi-jin's landlady.
 Heo Jin-na as Ko Yu-rim's mother 
The owner of a small restaurant.
 Kim Dong-gyun as Ko Yu-rim's father
A professional delivery driver.

Taeyang High School's fencing club
 Kim Hye-eun as Yang Chan-mi (양찬미)
The coach of the fencing team who enjoyed many honors as a gold medalist in fencing. She once accepted bribes and still feels betrayed by her friend Shin Jae-kyung who covered the story as a field reporter.
 Jo Bo-young as Lee Ye-ji (이예지)
1st year high school student. 
 Lee Ye-jin as Park Han-sol (박한솔)
1st year high school student.
 Moon Woo-bin as Kang Ji-soo (강지수)
3rd year high school student.
 Bang Eun-jung as Lee Da-seul (이다슬)
3rd year high school student.

Others
 Lee Chan-jong as Seo Jung-hyeok (서정혁)
UBS reporter and Baek Yi-jin's senior.

Special appearance
 Lee Joong-ok as Na Hee-do's coach at the fencing club of her old high school
 Jung Yu-min as Hwang Bo-mi (황보미), a student at Seonjung Girls' High School
 Jang Jun-hyun as Director of Han River C&T, an old acquaintance of Baek Yi-jin
 Choi Tae-joon as Jeong Ho-jin (정호진), a national fencing representative
 Yoon Joo-man as Park PD, an UBS producer 
 Kim Jun-ho as Kim Jun-ho (김준호), Na Hee-do's senior in the national fencing team 
 Kim Nam-hee as a mobile store salesperson
 Jeon Soo-hwan as Han River C&T interviewer
 Song Jae-jae as Han River C&T interview host
 Hong Eun-jung as Han River C&T job applicant
 Goo Ja-geon as Han River C&T job applicant
 Choi Gyo-sik as local resident
 Son Young-soon as old woman on the bus
 Ok Joo-ri as owner of a local shop
 Jeon Se-yong as man who resembles Baek Yi-jin's father

Episodes

Production

Casting 
On September 7, 2021, the main cast of the series was confirmed as Kim Tae-ri, Nam Joo-hyuk, Bona, Choi Hyun-wook, and Lee Joo-myung. It is Kim Tae-ri's first appearance on the small screen after a hiatus of three years. She last starred in Mr. Sunshine in 2018.

Filming
Filming of the series began on September 7, 2021. The series is set in Ahyeon-dong, Mapo District, Seoul and is filmed in Jeonju, Seohak-dong, Jeonju Hanok Village, Jeonju National University of Education's dormitory alley, and the National Intangible Heritage Center.

COVID-19 infections

On March 2, 2022, it was confirmed that actress Kim Tae-ri had been infected with COVID-19 since February 26, 2022, causing filming to be halted, with filming expected to resume after she recovers. The broadcast continued as usual. On March 3, 2022, it was confirmed that actor Choi Hyun-wook had tested positive for COVID-19. Both Kim and Choi went into isolation in accordance with the guidelines of the Quarantine Authority.

Release 
The series premiered on February 12, 2022 and aired every Saturday and Sunday at 21:10 (KST) on the South Korean television network tvN.

Original soundtrack 

The album peaked on number 7 on weekly Gaon Album Chart and as of April 2022, 35,426 copies have been sold.

Part 1

Part 2

Part 3

Part 4

Part 5

Part 6

Part 7

Part 8

Part 9

Chart performance

Reception

Reviews and ranking 
During the eight weeks of broadcast, Twenty-Five Twenty-One, Kim Tae-ri and Nam Joo-hyuk maintained the top spots in drama and actors popularity rankings conducted by Good Data Corporation. The series also placed first in viewership ratings for all its 16 episodes, in both the Metropolitan Area and nationwide. Additionally, it featured in Netflix's "Global Top 10" (non-English edition), a weekly list of the most-watched international Netflix shows, for 10 consecutive weeks (as of the week ending May 1, 2022). The drama's success was attributed to its "retro-sentimental" vibe that was presented through the use of props, fashion, and locations that were able to invoke nostalgia to the generation that experienced the 1990s. It was also stated that it had succeeded in gaining the empathy and sympathy of viewers as it depicts the struggles of the IMF period in Korea, which viewers connected with the ongoing COVID-19 pandemic.

Pierce Conran, in his review for the South China Morning Post, stated that the show had "an appealing theme, a story that is well told, great acting and clever staging and editing". Rhian Daly of NME described the drama as "a nostalgic dive into the memories of youth and the value of dreams."

Commercial impact 
The popularity of the series led to the elevated recognition for actress Kim Tae-ri, who was stated to have emerged as the new "Nation's First Love." The series was also notably popular among K-pop idols, with several artists, including BTS' Jungkook, Aespa's Karina, Red Velvet's Yeri, Girls' Generation's Sooyoung, Blackpink's Lisa, sharing that they have watched it and recommending it to their fans. Actor Gong Yoo also revealed that he watched the series Twenty-Five Twenty-One when he recommended his fans to watch My Liberation Notes.

Following the drama's conclusion, the Ministry of Culture, Sports and Tourism launched a travel product (itineraries alongside various accommodation and rental vouchers) touring the filming locations of the series, which includes the Jeonju Hanok Village, locations surrounding the Seohakdong Art Village, and the Hanbyeokgul Tunnel where the drama was shot. Retail company 7-Eleven reported that sales of its bakery brand Breadum had increased three-fold following the appearance of its pastry products on the show. The company then announced on April 7 that Breadum has launched two additional products in collaboration with the drama.

Investment company Daehan Securities has credited the success and high topicality of Twenty-Five Twenty-One alongside the recovery of television commercials for the 12% sales growth of CJ ENM, the parent company of broadcast channel tvN, during the first quarter of 2022.

With 2022 marking the renewed popularity of retro style in South Korea, Twenty-Five Twenty-One was stated to have greatly contributed to the "retro craze".

Following the appearance of the popular manhwa Full House in the show, its comic book set saw a sales growth of 1,044% in February 2022 (when the series started airing) which was followed by a 24.3% sales increase in March 2022 compared to the previous month.

In the Philippines, it was reported that the drama, with part of its plotline focused on fencing, led to an increased interest in the sport.

Criticism 
Despite its popularity and commercial success, Twenty-Five Twenty-One became subject to a few controversies. Netizens debated about the series' main plot line which involves romance between a legal adult and a character that is initially introduced as a minor, although a poll conducted on website Nate came out with 77% of over 3,000 respondents stating that there is no problem with the drama's love line. The drama also faced criticism for a scene in its 15th episode portraying a news coverage of the September 11 attacks, depicting the female lead smiling at her boyfriend giving live coverage of the incident, which some viewers deemed "inappropriate".

Philanthropy 
On August 19, 2022, lead actors Kim Tae-ri, Nam Joo-hyuk, Bona, Choi Hyun-wook and Lee Joo-myung donated all proceeds made from the OST to the Hope Bridge Korea Disaster Relief Association to help those affected by the 2022 South Korean floods.

Viewership

Accolades

References

External links
  
 Twenty-Five Twenty-One at Naver 
 Twenty-Five Twenty-One at Daum 
 
 
 

TVN (South Korean TV channel) television dramas
South Korean romance television series
Television series by Hwa&Dam Pictures
Television series by Studio Dragon
2022 South Korean television series debuts
2022 South Korean television series endings
Korean-language Netflix exclusive international distribution programming
Television productions suspended due to the COVID-19 pandemic
Television series set in 1998
Television series set in 2021